"Top of the World" is a song by Canadian hip hop group Rascalz, released as the second single from their third studio album, Global Warning. The song features fellow Canadian rapper K-os and Jamaican singer Barrington Levy, who sings the chorus.  The song appears on MuchMusic's compilation album, MuchDance 2001. It remains one of the group's most popular songs. In 2010, the song was sampled by Selah Sue on the title track of her 2010 EP, Raggamuffin.

Music video
The music video for "Top of the World" was filmed in Vancouver. The video features the group with Levy and K-os around several areas of the city.

The video reached #1 on MuchMusic Countdown for the week of July 28, 2000.

References

External links
 

1999 songs
2000 singles
Rascalz songs
K-os songs
ViK. Recordings singles